Cynthia Marshall (born December 15, 1959) is chief executive officer of the Dallas Mavericks. In February 2018, Marshall became the first Black female CEO in the history of the National Basketball Association. Marshall was also one of her university's first African-American cheerleaders at the University of California, Berkeley in the late 1970s. Marshall worked for AT&T for 36 years in leadership role focused on improving workplace culture and encouraging diversity/inclusion.

Early life and education 

Marshall moved from Birmingham, Alabama to California when she was three months old. Marshall was raised in Richmond, California with three siblings. She describes her childhood as being painful growing up in public housing projects with a family struggling to pay the bills. When she was 11 years old, Cynt witnessed her father shoot a man in the head in self-defense. In 1975, when Marshall was 15, her father broke her nose as she set out to save her mother from his domestic abuse. Her mother, Carolyn Gardener, was a high school executive administrator and resource librarian.

Marshall received a full scholarship to attend the University of California, Berkeley to study business administration and human resources management. While studying at Berkeley, Marshall became the university's first black cheerleader. After graduating from university at 21, she took on a job as a supervisor at AT&T.

Marshall worked in executive roles at AT&T for 36 years, where she focused on improving diversity and workplace behavior. She retired in 2017, and founded the consulting firm Managing Resources. While at AT&T she became the first African American head of the North Carolina Chamber of Commerce.

Dallas Mavericks

Mark Cuban hired Marshall following allegations claiming 20 years of sexual harassment and workplace misconduct within the Mavericks organization. Worth named Marshall as one of the 21 Most Powerful Women in the Business of Sports.

Personal life 
Marshall prefers to be called "Cynt" as she acquired the nickname with her high school track team — "Cynt the Sprint." Marshall is a cancer survivor. She married her husband Kenneth, and for 10 years they struggled to have kids. Cynt and Kenneth have four children together.

In 2022, Random House published Cynt's memoir You’ve Been Chosen: Thriving Through the Unexpected, which covers her personal and professional life as well as her battle with cancer.

References

Dallas Mavericks executives
National Basketball Association executives
20th-century American businesspeople
American chief executives
People from Richmond, California
1959 births
Living people